The following is a list of current Young Israel synagogues. It does not necessarily include every Young Israel synagogue.

Current Young Israel branches

Former Young Israel branches

This is a partial list of former Young Israel synagogues in New York City

Outside New York City

See also 
National Council of Young IsraelYoung Israel Shomrai EmunahYoung Israel of OttawaYoung Israel of FlatbushYoung Israel Beth El of Borough ParkElias SchwartzMordechai WilligBenzion Miller

Notes

References 

Lists of synagogues
Religious Zionist organizations